China was a monarchy from prehistoric times up to 1912 AD, when the Xinhai Revolution overthrew the Qing dynasty in favor of the Republic of China. The succession of legendary monarchs of China were non-hereditary. Dynastic rule began in circa 2070 BC when Yu the Great established the Xia dynasty, and lasted until 1912 AD when dynastic rule collapsed together with the monarchical government. Various attempts at preserving and restoring the Chinese monarchy occurred during and following the Xinhai Revolution, but these regimes were short-lived and lacked widespread recognition.

The monarchy of China took the form of absolute monarchy during most of its existence, even though the actual power of the ruler varied depending on his/her ability to consolidate the rule and various other factors. On 3 November 1911, the Qing dynasty issued the constitutional Nineteen Creeds which limited the power of the emperor, marking the official transition to a constitutional monarchy. However, after only 3 months, the Monarchy was abolished.

During periods of political disunity, China was divided among competing dynasties that often claimed exclusive Chinese politico-cultural orthodoxy; in such cases, more than one Chinese monarchy existed simultaneously. Throughout Chinese history, there were monarchs of both ethnic Han and non-Han origins, including many who were of mixed heritage.

Territorial domains

While the Chinese monarchy was originally established along the Yellow River and Yangtze River in China proper, various Chinese dynasties expanded to incorporate other regions into the Chinese realm.

At various points in time, the Chinese monarchy exercised control over China proper (including Hainan, Macau, and Hong Kong), Taiwan, Manchuria (both Inner Manchuria and Outer Manchuria), Sakhalin, Mongolia (both Inner Mongolia and Outer Mongolia), Vietnam, Tibet, Xinjiang, as well as parts of Central Asia, the Korean Peninsula, Afghanistan, and Siberia. In particular, certain groups of Western scholars use the term "China proper" to distinguish the "core" region of China populated chiefly by the Han people from the "frontier" regions of the Chinese monarchical realm with significant populations of ethnic minorities.

The Chinese monarchy reached its largest territorial extent under either the Yuan dynasty or the Qing dynasty, depending on the historical source. This discrepancy can be mainly attributed to the ambiguous northern border of the Yuan dynasty: whereas some sources describe the Yuan border as located to the immediate north of the northern shore of Lake Baikal, others posit that the Yuan dynasty reached as far north as the Arctic coast. Contrastingly, the borders of the Qing dynasty were demarcated and reinforced through a series of international treaties, including the Treaty of Nerchinsk and the Treaty of Kyakhta, and thus were more well-defined. The total area under the control of the Qing dynasty amounted to more than 13 million km at its peak.

Apart from exercising direct control over the Chinese realm, the Chinese monarchy also maintained hegemony over other states through the Chinese tributary system. The Chinese tributary system had its roots during the Western Han dynasty and lasted until the 19th century CE when the Sinocentric order collapsed.

Dynasties and ethnicities

Since the establishment of the Xia dynasty, China had been ruled by a succession of dynasties. A recurring theme in Chinese history, dynastic transitions occurred typically as a result of military conquest or usurpation. Historians often seek to account for Chinese dynastic transitions using the concept of dynastic cycle.

In history, China was ruled by dynasties of various ethnic origins. Although it is a common practice in Chinese historiography to label a particular dynasty as being ruled by a specific ethnicity, there were Chinese monarchs who had mixed heritage. For instance, the Emperor Xiaoming of the Xianbei-led Northern Wei dynasty was of mixed Xianbei and Han heritage; he obtained his Han ancestry from his mother, the Empress Ling. Similarly, the Kangxi Emperor of the Manchu-led Qing dynasty was of mixed Manchu and Han descent; he acquired his Han ancestry from his mother, the Empress Xiaokangzhang. Therefore, the ethnic identity of the ruling families as assigned by historians should not be regarded as absolute.

Abolition and legacy

On 10 October 1911, the Wuchang Uprising broke out in modern-day Wuhan, marking the start of the Xinhai Revolution. Led by the Tongmenghui, the predecessor of the Kuomintang, the Xinhai Revolution soon spread to other parts of China. On 1 January 1912, the Republic of China was proclaimed by Sun Yat-sen in Nanjing. On 12 February 1912, the Xuantong Emperor abdicated, marking the end of the Qing dynasty and the Chinese monarchy altogether.

According to the theory of the succession of states and Chinese historiographical tradition, the Republic of China is accepted as the legitimate successor to the Qing dynasty and the Chinese monarchy. In particular, the Imperial Edict of the Abdication of the Qing Emperor issued by the Empress Dowager Longyu provided the legal basis for the Republic of China to inherit all territories of the Qing dynasty and to preserve the territorial integrity of the new Chinese state.

The National Day of the Republic of China, celebrated today in the Taiwan Area, commemorates the anniversary of the Wuchang Uprising. It was also celebrated officially in mainland China between 1912 AD and 1949 AD prior to the retreat of the Government of the Republic of China to Taiwan.

Monarchism in post-monarchical China
During and after the Xinhai Revolution, there were various attempts at reviving the Chinese monarchy. All these attempts ultimately ended in failure.

Emperorship by Duke of Yansheng or Marquis of Extended Grace
During the Xinhai Revolution, there were numerous proposals advocating for the replacement of the Manchu-led Qing dynasty by a new dynasty of Han ethnicity. Kong Lingyi, a 76th-generation descendant of Confucius and the Duke of Yansheng, was identified as a potential candidate for Chinese emperorship by Liang Qichao. Meanwhile, gentry in Anhui and Hebei supported a restoration of the Ming dynasty under Zhu Yuxun, the Marquis of Extended Grace. Both suggestions failed to materialize.

Empire of China

In 1915 AD, Yuan Shikai proclaimed the Empire of China. It soon sparked the National Protection War and the empire was abolished after three months.

Manchu Restoration

In 1917 AD, the Qing loyalist Zhang Xun reinstalled Puyi to the Chinese throne. This attempt at restoring the Qing dynasty, known as the Manchu Restoration, lasted only 11 days.

Manchukuo

The Japanese puppet state Manchukuo was established in Northeast China in 1932 AD. This regime subsequently became a monarchy with Puyi as the emperor in 1934 AD. Manchukuo collapsed in 1945 AD following the Soviet invasion of Manchuria and the unconditional surrender of Japan.

Pretenders to the Chinese throne
The following is a list of pretenders to the abolished Chinese throne from the Aisin Gioro clan, the ruling house of the Qing dynasty and the Manchukuo.

Gallery

See also

 Chinese Empire Reform Association
 Chinese expansionism
 Chinese nobility
 Chinese sovereign
 Conquest dynasty
 Dragon Throne
 Dynasties in Chinese history
 East Asian cultural sphere
 Emperor at home, king abroad
 Emperor of China
 Family tree of ancient Chinese emperors
 Family tree of Chinese monarchs (early)
 Family tree of Chinese monarchs (late)
 Family tree of Chinese monarchs (middle)
 Foreign relations of imperial China
 Golden ages of China
 Historical capitals of China
 History of China
 List of Chinese monarchs
 List of recipients of tribute from China
 List of tributary states of China
 Mandate of Heaven
 Names of China
 Pax Sinica
 Political systems of Imperial China
 Royalist Party
 Sinicization
 Sinocentrism
 Succession to the Chinese throne
 Timeline of Chinese history
 Tongmenghui
 Tributary system of China

Notes

References

 
Monarchism in China